Don Epperson (born January 1938 - died 1973 in Arizona) was an American singer and actor. His daughter, Brenda Epperson is most well known for portraying Ashley Abbott on The Young and the Restless.

Filmography

External links
 

1938 births
1973 deaths
20th-century American male actors
20th-century American singers
20th-century American male singers